The National Citizen Will Party (PNVC), formerly known as the National Civic Veterans Party, is a minor christian-democratic and social-conservative political party in the Dominican Republic. It was founded on 10 May 1973 by Sergeant Federico Marte Pichardo, under the initiative of then-President Joaquin Balaguer, and was renamed on 8 March 2015. It is currently directed by Juan Cohen.

The party first contested national elections in 1982 when it won 1.6% of the vote, but failed to win a seat. For the 1986 and 1990 elections it was part of the victorious Social Christian Reformist Party-led coalition. For the 1994 elections it changed its allegiance to the Dominican Revolutionary Party-led coalition that won the Congressional elections but lost the presidential vote. It contested the 2002 elections alone, but failed to win a seat after receiving only 0.5% of the vote. For the 2006 elections it was part of the defeated Grand National Alliance.

References

Further reading

External links
Official website

Political parties in the Dominican Republic
Christian democratic parties in North America
Social conservative parties